Eva Harris (born August 6, 1965) is a professor in the School of Public Health at the University of California, Berkeley, and the founder and president of the Sustainable Sciences Institute. She focuses her research efforts on combating diseases that primarily afflict people in developing nations.

Early life and education
Harris is the daughter of linguist Zellig Harris and computer scientist Naomi Sager. She received a BA in biochemical sciences from Harvard University in 1987 and a PhD in molecular and cell biology from the University of California, Berkeley in 1993.

Career

After a post-doctoral fellowship and assistant adjunct professorship at the University of California, San Francisco, Harris joined the faculty at UC Berkeley. There, she developed a multidisciplinary approach for studying the virology, pathogenesis, and epidemiology of dengue fever, the most prevalent mosquito-borne viral disease in humans. Harris' lab studies the mechanism of dengue virus infection of human dendritic cells. The lab is also developing a mouse model to study viral tropism and the immune response to dengue virus infection, to generate a better model of the disease. Harris' fieldwork focuses on molecular and epidemiological field studies of dengue in endemic Latin American countries, particularly in Nicaragua. Ongoing fieldwork projects include clinical and biological studies of severe dengue, a pediatric cohort study of dengue transmission in Managua, and a project on evidence-based, community-derived interventions for prevention of dengue via control of its mosquito vector. Harris is currently initiating studies of dengue pathogenesis in humans, focusing on functional characterization of antibodies and B cell memory response, host gene expression profiling, and viral factors such as quasispecies. Harris is also collaborating with investigators at the UC Berkeley College of Engineering to develop the ImmunoSensor: a novel, rapid, low-cost diagnostic device for point-of-care diagnosis of dengue and other infectious diseases. She served as co-director of the "International Training and Research in Emerging Infectious Diseases" program at the Fogarty International Center from 1997 to 2003.

In 2010, Harris entered into a research agreement with NanoViricides, Inc. (NNVC).

She has published over 150 peer-reviewed articles.

Humanitarian work
While volunteering overseas, Harris noted the lack of resources available to her local peers. Knowing that the technologies and resources needed existed in the developed world, but were unavailable where they were most needed, inspired her to introduce molecular diagnostic techniques and scientific literacy in resource-poor settings. In 1997, Harris received a MacArthur Fellowship for her pioneering work over the previous ten years developing programs, and for working to build scientific capacity in developing countries to address public health and infectious disease issues. To continue and expand this work, Harris founded the Sustainable Sciences Institute in 1998, a San Francisco-based international nonprofit organization that works to improve public health in developing countries, by building local capacity for scientific research on infectious diseases. The Sustainable Sciences Institute partners with researchers in developing countries, offering assistance and mentoring to help them excel in their fields of research.

Harris is also a current board member of Hesperian Health Guides, a non-profit health publisher known for its flagship publication, Where There Is No Doctor.

Awards and honors

 2019 Beijerinck Virology Prize
 2018 Fellows of ASTMH (FASTMH)
 2002 Prytanean Faculty Award for outstanding women faculty
 2002 Global Leader for Tomorrow by the World Economic Forum
 2002 national recognition award from Minister of Health in Nicaragua for contribution to scientific development
 2001 Pew Scholar for her work on dengue pathogenesis
 1997 MacArthur Fellows Program for her scientific capacity building work

Publications
 A Low Cost Approach to PCR: Appropriate Transfer of Biomolecular Techniques, Editor Nazreen Kadir, Oxford University Press US, 1998,

References

External links
 "Straight talk from... Eva Harris", Nature Medicine 13, 1132 (2007)
 "A CONVERSATION WITH Eva Harris; How the Simple Side of High-Tech Makes the Developing World Better", The New York Times, Claudia Dreifus, September 30, 2003
 "Conversations with History" Institute of International Studies, UC Berkeley
 Conversations with History: Making Science Accessible, with Eva Harris

Harvard University alumni
University of California, Berkeley alumni
University of California, San Francisco faculty
American people of Russian-Jewish descent
American virologists
American women epidemiologists
American epidemiologists
Living people
1965 births
MacArthur Fellows
UC Berkeley School of Public Health faculty
21st-century American women